Cecilia Dazzi (born 17 October 1969) is an Italian actress, television personality and songwriter.

Early life 
Born in Rome, she is the daughter of film producer Tommaso Dazzi.

Career 
She made her film debut in 1987, in Ettore Scola's The Family. After working as an assistant of Carmelo Bene, in 1989 she went to New York City to pursue acting courses under Herbert Bergof. Her breakout came with the TV-series I ragazzi del muretto. In 1999 she won the David di Donatello for best supporting actress thanks to her performance in Cristina Comencini's Matrimoni. In 2002 she won the Flaiano Prize for her performance in I Am Emma.

Dazzi is also a songwriter, and she composed several of Niccolò Fabi's hits, including 'Capelli', winner of Mia Martini critics award. She also patented and developed a special pillow suitable for women with heavy breasts or suffering from mastitis.

Filmography

Film

Television

References

External links 
 

Italian film actresses
Italian television actresses
Italian stage actresses
1969 births
Musicians from Rome
Living people
Italian television personalities
David di Donatello winners
Italian women songwriters
Actresses from Rome
20th-century Italian actresses
21st-century Italian actresses